Lonela is a Romanian feminine given name. Notable people with the name include:

Lonela Loaieş (born 1979), Romanian artistic gymnast
Lonela Stanca-Galca (born 1981), Romanian team handball player
Lonela Târlea (born 1976), Romanian track and field athlete

Romanian feminine given names